This is a list of islands of Italy. There are over 400 islands in Italy, including islands in the Mediterranean Sea (including the marginal seas: Adriatic Sea, Ionian Sea, Libyan Sea, Ligurian Sea, Sea of Sardinia, Tyrrhenian Sea, and inland islands in lakes and rivers.

Insular Italy
The following sections list the islands by coastal region, major island, lagoon, or archipelago.

Calabria

Islands off the coast of Calabria include:

 - 
Cirella - 
Coreca Reefs - 
Isola di Dino (uninhabited) - 
Formiche Skerries - 
Galea Skerries - 
Galera Skerries - 
Godano Skerry - 
 -
 - 
 - 
 - 
 - 
 - 
 - 
 - 
, 
 - 
, 
 - 
 - 
Scorzone Skerry - 
, 
,  
 - 
 -

Campanian Archipelago

Islands in the Campanian Archipelago include:

Flegrean Isles 
Capri - 
Capri Faraglioni rocks - 
Monacone Skerry - 
Unghia Marina Skerry - 
Ischia (8th largest island at ) - 
Aragonese Castle - 
La Nave Skerry - 
Lorio Skerry - 
Sant'Anna Skerries - 
Levante Skerry - 
Ponente Skerry - 
Gaiola - 
Li Galli - 
Castelluccia Islet - 
Il Gallo Lungo - 
Nisida - 
Rotonda Islet - 
Isola Licosa - 
Megaride - 
Pennata - 
Procida - 
Vivara - 
Rovigliano Skerry  - 
San Martino - 
Vervece Skerry - 
Vetara Skerry -

Cheradi Islands

The Cheradi Islands include:

Campo Islet - 
Gallipoli - 
San Paolo - 
San Pietro - 
Sant'Andrea -

Grado Lagoon
There are nearly 120 islands in the Marano Grado Lagoon of the Adriatic Sea, including:

 (canal) - 
Barbana - 
 Fossalon Island near Grado - 
Isola di Grado -  
, 
 - 
 (canal) -

Gulf of La Spezia

Islands in the Gulf of La Spezia include:
Ferale Skerry - 
Palmaria - 
Scola - 
Tinetto - 
Tino -

Ligurian Islands

The Italian islands in the Ligurian Sea include:
Bergeggi (uninhabited 
Gallinara (private) -

Marano Lagoon
Islands in the Marano Lagoon include:
Isola Marinetta - 
 - 
 -

Pedagne peninsula
Islands in the  include:

 - 
 - 
 - 
, 
 -

Pontine Islands

Islands in the Pontine Islands arechipieligo (Tyrrhenian Sea) include:

 Isolo di Gavi (uninhabited) - 
Le Scoglitelle Skerries - 
Piana di Mezzo Skerry - 
Rosso Skerry - 
 Palmarola - 
 - 
Forcina Skerry - 
I Piatti Skerries - 
Pallante Skerry - 
Scuncillo Skerry - 
Suvace Skerry - 
 Ponza - 
Aniello Antonio Skerry - 
Cantina Skerries - 
Faraglioni della Madonna - 
Faraglioni di Calzo - 
Faraglioni di Maria Rosa - 
Felce Skerries - 
Montagnello Skerry - 
Ravia Skerry - 
Rosso Skerry - 
Santo Stefano - 
Ventotene - 
Nave Skerry - 
Zannone (uninhabited) -

Porto Cesareo lagoon

Islands in the Porto Cesareo lagoon include:

Conigli - 
Lo Scoglio - 
Malva - 
 - 
 - 
 -

Sardinia

Sardinia is the second largest island and includes the following outlying islands:

 - 
Bocca - 
Asinara (7th largest island at )-  
 - 
 - 
 - 
Isolotto - 
 - 
 - 
 - 
 - 
 - 
 - 
 - 
 - 
 - 
Cavoli - 
 - 
 - 
 - 
 - 
 - 
 - 
 - 
 - 
 - 
 - 
 - 

La Ghignetta Skerry - 
Maddalena archipelago
Barrettinelli di Dentro - 
Barrettinelli di Fuori - 
Barrettini - 
 - 
Budelli (uninhabited)- 
Caprera - 
 - 
 - 
 - 
 - 
La Maddalena - 
 - 
 - 
 - 
 - 
Razzoli - 
 - 
Santo Stefano - 
 - 
Spargi (uninhabited) - 
 - 
 - 
Mal di Ventre (private) - 
 - 
Monte Russo Skerries - 
 - 
 - 
Mortoriotto Skerries - 
 - 
Munichedda Skerry - 
 - 
 - 
 - 
 - 
 - 
 - 
 - 
 - 
 - 
 - 
 - 
 - 
] - 
 - 
 - 
 - 
 - 
Sa Craba Skerry - 
 - 
 - 
Sa Tonnara Skerry - 
 - 
 - 
 - 
 - 
 - 
 - 
Le Camere Islets - 
 - 
 - 
Su Scoglio Mannu - 
 - 
Sulcis Archipelago
 - 
San Pietro (5th largest at ) - 
 - 
 - 
 - 
 - 
- 
 - 
Sant'Antioco (4th largest island at )- 
 - 
 - 
 - 
 - 
 - 
 - 
Tavolara Islands - 
Molara Island - 
 - 
 - 
 - 
 - 
 - 
 - 
 - 
 -

Sicily

The island of Sicily includes the following outlying islands: 

Aegadian Islands include:
Favignana - 
 - 
 - 
 - 
 - 
Formica Islet - 
Levanzo - 
Il Faraglione (it) - 
Isola Maraone (it) - 
Marettimo - 
 - 
Augusta - 
Bella - 
 - 
Capo Passero Island - 
Correnti Islet - 
Aeolian Islands islands include:
Alicudi - 
 - 
Basiluzzo - 
 - 
 - 
 - 
Filicudi - 
Cuddurra Skerry - 
Fortuna Skerry - 
 - 
 - 
 - 
 - 
Lipari (9th largest ) - 
 - 
 - 
Panarea - 
 - 
 - 
 - 
 - 
 - 
 - 
Salina (10th largest at ) - 
 - 
Stromboli - 
Strombolicchio - 
Vulcano - 
 - 
 - 
 - 
 - 
 - 
 - 
Cyclopean Isles islands include:
 -  
Faraglione Grande - 
Faraglione di Mezzo
Faraglione degli Uccelli
 - 
Femmine Islet - 
Ferdinandea (submerged volcano) - 
 - 
 - 
 - 
 - 
 - 
Ortygia - 
 - 
 - 
Pantelleria (5th largest island at ) - 
 - 
 - 
 - 
 - 
 - 
 - 
Pelagian Islands include:
Lampedusa - 
 - 
 - 
 - 
 - 
Lampione (uninhabited) - 
Linosa - 
 - 
 - 
 - 
 - 
 - 
 - 
 - 
 - 
 - 
 - 
 - 
 - 
Stagnone Lagoon (Isolo dello Stagnone it) include:
Isola Grande (it) - 
Isola La Scuola (it) - 
San Pantaleo - 
Isola Santa Maria (it) - 
 - 
Scoglio Due Fratelli - 
Ustica - 
 - 
 - 
 - 
 - 
 - 
 -

Tremiti Islands

Islands in the Isole Tremiti are in the Adriatic Sea and include:
 Capraia - 
 Isola San Domino - 
 Isola San Nicola - 
  - 
 Isola Pianosa -

Tuscan Archipelago

Islands in the Tuscan Archipelago include:

Argentarola Islet - 
 - 
Capra Skerry - 
Capraia - 
 - 
 - 
Elba (3rd largest at  - 
 - 
 - 
 - 
Formiche di Grosseto - 
 - 
Gatto Skerry - 
 - 
Giannutri - 
Giglio - 
Gorgona - 
I Fratelli Skerry - 
 - 
 - 
 - 
La Nave Skerry - 
 - 
Meloria - 
Montecristo - 
Mosè Skerry - 
Ogliera Skerry - 
 - 
Palmaiola - 
Paolina Islet - 
 - 
Pianosa - 
 - 
Schiappino Skerry - 
Scoglietto di Portoferraio - 
Scoglio d'Africa - 
Scoglione - 
 - 
 - 
 -

Venetian Lagoon

Islands in the Venetian Lagoon of the Adriatic Sea include:

Albarella- 
 - 
Baccan di Sant'Erasmo - 
 - 
Burano - 
 - 
 - 
 - 
 - 
Chioggia - 
 - 
 - 
 - 
Giudecca - 
 - 
Isola dell'Unione - 
La Certosa - 
 - 
 - 
Lazzaretto Nuovo - 
Lazzaretto Vecchio - 
Lido - 
 - 
 - 
Mazzorbo - 
 - 
 - 
 - 
Murano - 
 - 
 - 
 - 
 - 
 - 
Pellestrina - 
Poveglia - 
Sacca Fisola - 
 - 
Sacca Sessola - 
San Clemente - 
San Francesco del Deserto - 
San Giacomo in Paludo - 
San Giorgio in Alga - 
San Giorgio Maggiore - 
 - 
San Lazzaro degli Armeni - 
San Marco in Boccalama (former island) - 
San Michele - 
San Pietro di Castello - 
San Secondo - 
San Servolo - 
Sant'Andrea - 
Sant'Angelo della Polvere (uninhabited) - 
Sant'Elena - 
Sant'Erasmo - 
 - 
Santa Maria della Grazia - 
 - 
Sottomarina - 
 - 
 - 
Torcello - 
 - 
Tronchetto - 
Venice - 
Vignole -

Islands in lakes and rivers

Islands in inland lakes and rivers include:

 Lago di Bolsena
 , 
 , 
 Lago di Como
 Isola Comacina, 
 Lago di Garda
 Isola del Garda (private), 
 , 
 , 
 , 
 
 Lago d'Iseo
 
 Montisola (Monte Isola), 
 , 
 Lago Maggiore
 Isole Borromee
Isola Bella, 
Isola Madre, 
Scoglio della Malghera, 
Isola dei Pescatori (or Isola Superiore), 
Isolino di San Giovanni, 
Castelli di Cannero, 
Isolino Partegora, 
 Lago d'Orta
 Isola San Giulio, 
 Lago Trasimeno
 Isola Polvese, 
 Isola Maggiore, 
 Isola Minore, 
Tiber River
Isola Tiberina, 
Isola Sacra, 
Po River delta
 , 
 ,

See also
 :it:Isole dell'Italia (Italian WikiPedia)
 Insular Italy
 List of islands in the Mediterranean
 List of islands in the Adriatic
 List of islands
 List of bridges in Italy

References

Translations of terms Italian=English:

Isola=Island
Isole=Islands
Lago/Lage=Lake/Lakes
Laguna=Lagoon
Penisola=Peninsula
Isolotto=Islet
Skeery=Reef (Rock isle)
Scoglio=Rock

Italy, List of islands of
 Islands of Italy
Islands of Italy, List of